Fiachna Ó Braonáin (born 27 November 1965) plays the guitar and sings vocals with the Irish band Hothouse Flowers. Born in Dublin, he received his school education at Scoil Lorcáin and Coláiste Eoin. The Hothouse Flowers were founded as a Dublin street-performance act called the Incomparable Benzini Brothers by Fiachna and his schoolmate Liam Ó Maonlaí.

Fiachna appears on a duet with Belinda Carlisle on her 2007 release, Voila.

In September 2007, he released an album with his other band PreNup. Fellow musicians are Cait O'Riordan (Ex-Pogues) and Dave Clarke (Hothouse Flowers). In addition to that, Fiachna also previously hosted "Poetic Champions", a radio show that aired on Today FM every Sunday night from 7–8pm with the program involving Irish musicians who discuss the various albums that had an influence on them and their careers.

Discography

With Hothouse Flowers
 People - 1988 - UK No. 2
 Home - 1990  - UK No. 5
 Songs From the Rain - 1993  - UK No. 7
 Born - 1998
 Live - 1999
 Hothouse Flowers: The Best Of - 2000
 The Vaults: Volume 1 - 2003
 Into Your Heart - 2004
 Hothouse Flowers: The Platinum Collection - 2006

With PreNup
 Hell to Pay - 2007

With Michelle Shocked
 Artists Make Lousy Slaves - 1996

Guest appearance
 Indigo Girls – Indigo Girls (1989)
 Def Leppard – Retro Active (1993)

References

External links

1965 births
Living people
Irish buskers
Irish rock guitarists
Irish male guitarists
Musicians from County Dublin
20th-century guitarists
21st-century guitarists
20th-century Irish male  singers
21st-century Irish male  singers
Hothouse Flowers members
Irish-language singers